The 2022 Derby City Council election took place on 5 May 2022 to elect members of Derby City Council in England. This was on the same day as other local elections. One-third of the seats were up for election.

Results summary

Ward results

Abbey

Allestree

Alvaston

Arboretum

Blagreaves

Boulton

Chaddesden

Chellaston

Darley

 
 
 
 

 

Although Darley was a Labour hold from the 2018 Derby City Council election it was a Labour gain from 2021 when it was won by the Conservatives at a by-election held concurrently with the main 2021 Derby City Council election.

Derwent

Littleover

Mackworth

Mickleover

Normanton

Oakwood

Sinfin

Spondon

References

Derby City
Derby City Council elections